Pilar is the capital city of the Paraguayan department of Ñeembucú, located along the Paraguay River in the southwestern part of the country.

History 

Pilar was founded by Pedro Melo de Portugal on October 12, 1779.  The original name of the settlement was Villa del Ñeembucú, named for the nearby Arroyo Ñeembucú that flows into the Paraguay River.  Four years later it was renamed Villa del Pilar by Spanish priest  Marcial Antonio Uliambre, for the Basilica of Our Lady of the Pillar in his hometown of Zaragoza.

Demographics

Pilar has a total population of 32,810, with 14,298 men and 15,030 women, according to information provided by the General Directorate of Statistics, Polls and Census.

Tourism

The center of the city is home to a large number of historical buildings dating back to the founding of the city.

The Basilica of Our Lady of Pilar, whose feast day is celebrated on October 12, is a magnificent church constructed by Italian missionaries to the city.

During Semana Santa the city is the site of a large fishing tournament and competition that attracts participants and spectators from all over Paraguay and Northern Argentina.

The city's location on the Rio Paraguay provides a prime location for boating and fishing. There are walking paths, pavilions, and parks located on the shores of the river. The shores of the calmer Arroyo Ñeembucú provide the city's residents with a beach to enjoy on hot December days.

The Town Council Museum was constructed in 1817, during the government of President Gaspar Rodríguez de Francia. It is excellently preserved. This is the only build of this nature that is still preserved in the country. The museum contains objects of historical importance including photographs, trophies and medals that belonged to the Marshall López, as well as pieces of columns from the old church, weapons, bullets, ammunitions, chains, lances, shields and other historical artifacts.

A very popular tourist destination is also the "Fiesta Hawaiana" Party every January 2. In recent years, this party which is held alongside the Neembucu River has reached about 20,000 to 30,000 people coming from all parts of Paraguay, Argentina, Uruguay and Brazil.

Pilar is considered as one of the most safe and clean cities in all Paraguay.

Transportation

Pilar is served by Carlos Miguel Jiménez Airport, however traffic is limited to private airplanes.

Located at the very Argentina–Paraguay border, the ferry traffic from the harbor of Pilar connects the city to Puerto Cano, which is close to Resistencia and Formosa in Argentina.  There is a paved highway, the Route 4, that is 140 km long and starts at San Ignacio.

Until quite recently, there was no paved route to Asunción, and the city was nearly isolated during periods of rain. Today, however, there is the Villeta–Alberdi–Pilar Route that connects the capital with Pilar, and daily buses use it to go to various other cities. The primary mode of transportation to other cities is by bus from the Central Terminal, which offers routes to Asunción and its suburbs such as Luque, Ñemby, and San Lorenzo, as well as Ciudad del Este, Villarrica, Pedro Juan Caballero, Encarnación, Santa Rita, Humaitá, Concepción, Mariscal Estigarribia and Villa Hayes.

Within the city, motorcycles and mopeds make up the bulk of traffic, with bicycles also constituting a significant percentage of traffic. In addition, it is quite possible to find people on horseback, in horse-drawn carts, on foot, and in cars or trucks on the same street.

Climate

Situated near the confluence of the Paraguay and Paraná rivers, Pilar is in a region of the country with many small streams, rivers and wetlands that contribute to a humid climate. The rainy months are January, March, April and October; the dryer are May and August. The Köppen Climate Classification subtype for this climate is "Cfa" (Humid Subtropical Climate).

Sister cities 
Pilar has a sister city:

 Carmelo, Uruguay

Sources 
World Gazeteer: Paraguay – World-Gazetteer.com

References

External links

Populated places established in 1779
Populated places in the Ñeembucú Department